Schwenckia is a genus of flowering plants in the family Solanaceae, native to Central America and South America, and with one species, S. americana, a widespread weed in Africa. In the title of the generic description Linnaeus wrote "Schwenkia" but gave the binomial of the type species as Schwenckia americana, while quoting Dav. van Royen as the author.

Species
Currently accepted species include:
Schwenckia alvaroana Benítez
Schwenckia americana L.
Schwenckia angustifolia Benth.
Schwenckia breviseta Casar.
Schwenckia curviflora Benth.
Schwenckia elegans Carvalho
Schwenckia filiformis Ekman ex Urb.
Schwenckia glabrata Kunth
Schwenckia grandiflora Benth.
Schwenckia heterantha Carvalho
Schwenckia huberi Benítez
Schwenckia hyssopifolia Benth.
Schwenckia juncoides Chodat
Schwenckia lateriflora (Vahl) Carvalho
Schwenckia longiseta Casar.
Schwenckia micrantha Benth.
Schwenckia mollissima Nees & Mart.
Schwenckia novaveneciana Carvalho
Schwenckia paniculata (Raddi) Carvalho
Schwenckia trujilloi Benítez
Schwenckia volubilis Benth.

References

Solanaceae
Solanaceae genera